Knut Arvid Swendel (13 January 1888 – 23 August 1962) was a Swedish rower who competed in the 1912 Summer Olympics. He was a crew member of the Swedish boat Göteborgs that was eliminated in the first round of the men's eight tournament.

References

1888 births
1962 deaths
Swedish male rowers
Olympic rowers of Sweden
Rowers at the 1912 Summer Olympics
Sportspeople from Karlstad